"My Favorite Part" is a song by American rapper Mac Miller, featuring singer Ariana Grande, from Miller's fourth studio album The Divine Feminine (2016). The song was written by Miller, Grande, and its producer, MusicManTy. It was released by Warner Bros. Records as the third single from The Divine Feminine on September 9, 2016. A music video was released on December 12, 2016.

Background and release 
"My Favorite Part" was written by Mac Miller, Ariana Grande, and its producer, Tyrone "MusicManTy" Johnson. The song was released by Warner Bros. Records on September 9, 2016, as the third single from Miller's fourth studio album The Divine Feminine (2016). "My Favorite Part" is an R&B and neo soul love song, with Miller singing instead of rapping.

It is the third collaboration between Miller and Grande, following Grande's single "The Way" (2013) and a remix of Grande's single "Into You" (2016). Miller and Grande were in a relationship when "My Favorite Part" was released, but the song had been written before it began, according to Miller.

Music video 
On December 12, 2016, Miller released a music video for "My Favorite Part", directed by _p. In the video, Grande enters her apartment complex in pouring rain and is helped by Miller when she drops her groceries. They enter their rooms and gaze at the wall that separates them, while reeling over their emotions for each other. After rain leaks inside, Miller visits Grande and she pulls him into her room.

Live performances 
Miller and Grande performed the song on a concert special for Audience Network, which aired on September 30, 2016.

Charts

Certifications

References

2016 singles
2016 songs
Ariana Grande songs
Mac Miller songs
Male–female vocal duets
Neo soul songs
Songs written by Ariana Grande
Songs written by Mac Miller
Warner Records singles